Thorleif Birger Vangen (11 September 1920 – 1 March 1996) was a Norwegian skier from Kongsvinger. He competed in cross-country skiing at the 1948 Winter Olympics. He was Norwegian champion in 18 km in 1948, in 30 km in 1946 and 1947, and in 50 km in 1946.

Cross-country skiing results

Olympic Games

References

1920 births
1996 deaths
Sportspeople from Kongsvinger
Norwegian male cross-country skiers
Olympic cross-country skiers of Norway
Cross-country skiers at the 1948 Winter Olympics